The 15th Louisiana Infantry Regiment was a unit of volunteers recruited in Louisiana that fought in the Confederate States Army during the American Civil War. Formed in June 1861 as the 2nd Regiment, Polish Brigade, the unit was sent to fight in the Eastern Theater of the American Civil War. As the 3rd Louisiana Infantry Battalion, the unit served at Beaver Dam Creek and Glendale. After two companies from the 7th Louisiana Infantry Battalion were added in July 1862, the unit reorganized as the 15th Louisiana Infantry Regiment. It joined the 2nd Louisiana Brigade and fought at Cedar Mountain, Second Bull Run, Antietam, and Fredericksburg in 1862. It served at Chancellorsville, Second Winchester, Gettysburg, and Mine Run in 1863. The regiment fought at the Wilderness, Spotsylvania, Cold Harbor, Monocacy, Third Winchester, Fisher's Hill, Cedar Creek, and Petersburg in 1864. A handful of survivors surrendered at Appomattox in 1865.

See also
List of Louisiana Confederate Civil War units
Louisiana in the Civil War

Notes

References

 

 

 

Units and formations of the Confederate States Army from Louisiana
1861 establishments in Louisiana
Military units and formations established in 1861
1865 disestablishments in Louisiana
Military units and formations disestablished in 1865